Richard Alan (Rick) Miller (born  April 19, 1948) is an American former outfielder in Major League Baseball from 1971 to 1985. Miller attended Union High School (Grand Rapids, Michigan) and was a star athlete in the Grand Rapids City League. On September 4, 1971, Miller, at the age of 23, broke into the big leagues with the Boston Red Sox. He spent 12 of his 15 seasons as a member of the Boston Red Sox, he also played with the California Angels. Miller was an accomplished fielder who won a Gold Glove in 1978 for his play in center field.

He was traded along with Carney Lansford and Mark Clear from the Angels to the Red Sox for Rick Burleson and Butch Hobson on December 10, 1980.

In a 15-year career covering 1482 games, Miller compiled a .269 batting average (1046-for-3887) with 552 runs, 28 home runs and 369 RBI. Defensively, he recorded a .986 fielding percentage at all three outfield positions and first base. In the postseason, in the 1975 World Series and 1979 American League Championship Series, he batted .222 (4-for-18) with 2 runs scored.

In 2007, Miller was named as the manager of the Nashua Pride of the Canadian American Association of Professional Baseball, a team he managed through the end of the 2008 season. In 2012, he was named the manager of the New Bedford Bay Sox of the New England Collegiate Baseball League.

Miller is the brother in law of former teammate Carlton Fisk, having married Fisk's sister Janet.

References

External links

Rick Miller at SABR (Baseball BioProject)

1948 births
Baseball players from Grand Rapids, Michigan
Boston Red Sox players
California Angels players
Gold Glove Award winners
Living people
Louisville Colonels (minor league) players
Major League Baseball center fielders
Michigan State Spartans baseball players
Minor league baseball managers
Pawtucket Red Sox players
Pittsfield Red Sox players